Hendricks Field  is a private use airport located three nautical miles (6 km) northeast of Gouverneur, a village in the Town of Gouverneur, St. Lawrence County, New York, United States. It was formerly a public use airport at which time its FAA location identifier was 1K0.

Facilities and aircraft 
It has one runway designated 5/23 turf surface measuring 2,520 by 70 feet (768 x 21 m). For the 12-month period ending August 22, 2002, the airport had 1,350 general aviation aircraft operations, an average of 113 per month. At that time there were 10 aircraft based at this airport: 80% single-engine and 20% ultralight.

References

External links 
 Aerial image as of May 1997 from USGS The National Map
 

Airports in New York (state)
Transportation buildings and structures in St. Lawrence County, New York